City Hindus Network (CHN)  is a not-for-profit organisation created to promote networking, spirituality, education and charity amongst Hindu professionals. It was founded in 2005 by Dhruv Patel OBE, who was succeeded by entrepreneur Pratik Dattani. Its current Chair is Alpesh Patel OBE, who was appointed in December 2019. CHN is focused on building closer relationships between Hindu professionals working in the City of London.

History 

CHN's first major event was held by the then Mayor of London, Ken Livingstone, for the British Hindu community, at City Hall in London.

Since then, the CHN has organised networking events, talks on Hindu philosophy and spirituality, a mentoring scheme, charity and volunteering events for Hindu professionals, and taken part in community and government liaison on behalf of the Hindu community. Many of its events have been in conjunction with the accountancy and consulting firms and investment banks in London, alongside other Hindu community partners, such as Diwali in London, built relationships with the Metropolitan City Police and charities such as Odanadi, Women in Need, Joshua Playing Project and London Community Transport.

CHN has also worked closely with other faith networks including City Sikhs to organise the largest hustings events in London. Recent events include a Career Clinic with Alpesh Patel OBE and former Committee Member Tarang Katira. Mr Katira was a former Director of the City Hindus Network, who was jailed in 2019 physical, verbal and psychological abuse towards his partner. He pleaded guilty to one charge of controlling or coercive behaviour, contrary to Section 76 of the UK's Serious Crime Act 2015.

Awards and nominations 

 The founder of CHN, Dhruv Patel received an OBE in the 2018 Birthday Honours as a result of his community work through CHN and elsewhere.
The chairman of CHN, Alpesh Patel received an OBE in the 2020 Birthday Honours as a result of his services to the economy and international trade.

References

External links
City Hindus Network website

Hindu organisations based in the United Kingdom
Non-profit organisations based in the United Kingdom
Organizations established in 2005
2005 establishments in the United Kingdom